Marie-Claire Restoux (born 9 April 1968 in La Rochefoucauld, Charente) is a French judoka, world champion and Olympic champion. She won a gold medal in the half lightweight division at the 1996 Summer Olympics in Atlanta.

She received a gold medal at the 1995 World Judo Championships, and again in 1997, and a bronze medal in 1999.

References

External links
 

1968 births
Living people
Sportspeople from Charente
French female judoka
Olympic judoka of France
Judoka at the 1996 Summer Olympics
Olympic gold medalists for France
Olympic medalists in judo
Medalists at the 1996 Summer Olympics
Mediterranean Games gold medalists for France
Mediterranean Games medalists in judo
Competitors at the 1997 Mediterranean Games
21st-century French women
20th-century French women